Group B of the 1997 Fed Cup Europe/Africa Zone Group II was one of four pools in the Europe/Africa zone of the 1997 Fed Cup. Six teams competed in a round robin competition, with the top team advancing to Group I for 1998.

Yugoslavia vs. Algeria

Ireland vs. Tunisia

Cameroon vs. Iceland

Yugoslavia vs. Iceland

Ireland vs. Algeria

Tunisia vs. Cameroon

Yugoslavia vs. Cameroon

Ireland vs. Iceland

Tunisia vs. Algeria

Yugoslavia vs. Ireland

Tunisia vs. Iceland

Algeria vs. Cameroon

Yugoslavia vs. Tunisia

Ireland vs. Cameroon

Algeria vs. Iceland

  placed first in the pool, and thus advanced to Group I in 1998, where they placed third in their group of four.

See also
Fed Cup structure

References

External links
 Fed Cup website

1997 Fed Cup Europe/Africa Zone